Ubauro Tehsil is an administrative subdivision (tehsil) of Ghotki District in the Sindh province of Pakistan. It is administratively subdivided into eight Union Councils, one of which form the capital Ubauro.

References

Talukas of Sindh
Ghotki District